Lake Chimay or Chiamay, also known by numerous other names, was a fictious lake or marsh which appeared in European maps of Asia throughout the Age of Discovery. It continued to appear in European maps, gazetteers, and encyclopedias into the late 18th century.

Names
The name has appeared as Chimay, Cunebetét, Chiamay, Chiammay, Jangamá, Jangoma, Cayamay, Chiama, Jamahey, Chiamai, Chaamay, Chiama, Cunebete, and Singapamor. Given its use in de Barros and Mendes Pinto both in reference to the lake or marsh and to the surrounding kingdom and its nearby capital, it appears to have originally taken its name from Chiang Mai, capital of the Kingdom of Lanna.

History
Barros had previously met with Fernão Mendes Pinto, whose journal of his travels in the 1540s was later published, including two passages about a lake either 36 or 180 leagues around surrounded by prosperous mines and possibly originating the Ganges in addition to the other great rivers of the region. As , the lake was greatly popularized by the "Ramusio Map", a map of Southeast Asia drafted by Giacomo Gastaldi and used as the third map in the 1554 second volume of Giovanni Battista Ramusio's . Gastaldi gave the lake as the origin of the Brahmaputra, Irrawaddy, Salween, and Chao Phraya.

No major lake has ever existed in the area of Chiang Mai, butestablished by Barros and Ramusio's reputationsthe lake spread across new European maps as late as 1751 and continued in the form of reprints even longer, at least as late as 1783. During the same period, it continued to be mentioned in gazetteers and encyclopedias, including an entry in the first edition of the Encyclopaedia Britannica.

See also
 History and Geography of Thailand
 History and Geography of Burma
 Age of Discovery
 History of cartography and geography
 Cartography of Asia

References

Citations

Bibliography
 .
 .
 .
 .
 .

Fictional lakes
Cartographic errors